Haldaa is a 2017 Bangladeshi film directed by Tauquir Ahmed, based on the story written by Azad Bulbul. The film's plot is based on the struggling life of the fishermen of Halda River located in Chittagong, the only natural fish breeding center in Asia. The film is narrated in local Chittagonian dialect, although the dialogues are simplified for the understanding of the general audience.

Cast 
 Mosharraf Karim as Bodi
 Zahid Hasan as Nader Chowdhury
 Nusrat Imrose Tisha as Hashu
 Fazlur Rahman Babu as Monu Miya
 Dilara Zaman
 Shahed Ali
 Runa Khan

Music 
Musics for the film were composed by Pintu Ghosh. The lyrics were written by Ramesh Shil, Tauquir Ahmed and Pintu Ghosh.

Release 
The movie was released on 1 December 2017 in 81 theaters in Bangladesh. The theatrical release poster was by Bipasha Hayat.

Awards
8th SAARC Film Festival 2018
Best Feature Film Award
Best Original Score
Best Editor
Best Cinematographer

References

External links 
 

2017 films
2017 drama films
Bengali-language Bangladeshi films
Bangladeshi drama films
Films directed by Tauquir Ahmed
2010s Bengali-language films
Films whose writer won the Best Screenplay National Film Award (Bangladesh)